This is a List of Asia Pacific Floorball Champions, including runners-up. An Asian Pacific Floorball Championship is awarded to the team which wins in the finals of that year's Asia Pacific Floorball Championships.

The most recent Asia Pacific Floorball Champions are Japan, who won in both the men's and women's categories.

The Asia Pacific Floorball Championships are organized by the Asia Oceania Floorball Confederation. From year 2010 onwards the APAC has been the Asia and Oceania Qualification tournament for the Men´s and Women´s World Championships. The Asia Pacific Floorball Championship was succeeded by the Asia-Oceania Floorball Cup which held its first edition in 2017.

Men's Asia Pacific Floorball Championships

Note: A "—" in the score column represents a year with no final. Those championships were decided by the leader at the end of the group stage.

Women's Asia Pacific Floorball Championships

Note: A "—" in the score column represents a year with no final. Those championships were decided by the leader at the end of the group stage.

See also 
 Asia-Oceania Floorball Cup
 Southeast Asian Floorball Championships
 Floorball World Championships

References

External links
 http://www.floorball.org/pages/EN/AOFC
 http://theroonba.com/floorball/men/2018.html
 http://www.floorball.org/pages/EN/Asia-Pacific-Floorball-Championships
 http://www.floorball.org/pages/EN/APAC-2012-Men-WFCQ - 2012
 http://www.floorball.org/pages/EN/APAC-2011-Men-and-Women - 2011
 http://www.floorball.org/default.asp?kieli=826&sivu=340&alasivu=340 - 2010
 http://www.floorball.org/pages/EN/APAC-2009-Men-and-Women - 2009
 http://www.floorball.org/pages/EN/APAC-2008-Men - 2008
 http://www.floorball.org/pages/EN/APAC-2007-Men - 2007
 http://www.floorball.org/pages/EN/APAC-2006-Men - 2006
 http://www.floorball.org/pages/EN/APAC-2005-Men-and-Women - 2005
 http://www.floorball.org/pages/EN/APAC-2004-Men-and-Women - 2004
 http://www.floorball.org/pages/EN/Mens-WFCQ-2018-AOFC-South-Korea - 2018
 http://www.floorball.org/pages/EN/Womens-WFCQ-2017-AOFC-New-Zealand - 2017
 http://www.floorball.org/pages/EN/Mens-WFCQ-2016-AOFC-Thailand - 2016
 http://www.floorball.org/pages/EN/Womens-WFCQ-2015-AOFC-Australia - 2015
 http://www.floorball.org/default.asp?sivu=5&alasivu=622&kieli=826 - 2014
 http://www.floorball.org/default.asp?sivu=5&alasivu=575&kieli=826 - 2013
 http://www.floorball.org/default.asp?kieli=826&sivu=503&alasivu=503 - 2012
 http://www.floorball.org/default.asp?kieli=826&sivu=456&alasivu=456 - 2011
 http://www.floorball.org/pages/EN/Womens-WFC-2007-Qualifications - 2007

Floorball competitions
Floorball in Asia
Floorball in Oceania